El Bruc is a municipality in the comarca of the Anoia in Catalonia, Spain. It is situated on the side of Montserrat, of which the north-western third is within the municipality. A local road connects the village with the main N-II road from Barcelona to Lleida, and to
Monistrol de Montserrat via the monastery.

It was the site of the Battles of the Bruch between France and Spain in 1808.

Demography

References

 Panareda Clopés, Josep Maria; Rios Calvet, Jaume; Rabella Vives, Josep Maria (1989). Guia de Catalunya, Barcelona: Caixa de Catalunya.  (Spanish).  (Catalan).

External links

Official website 
 Government data pages 

Municipalities in Anoia
Populated places in Anoia